Dartmoor is a rural community in the Hastings District and Hawke's Bay Region of New Zealand's North Island. It is located west of Napier on the northern bank of the Tutaekuri River.

In February 2023, Dartmoor was severely affected by flooding from Cyclone Gabrielle. Water from the Tutaekuri River rose above homes and damaged much of the agricultural land.

References

Hastings District
Populated places in the Hawke's Bay Region